Eccleston is a civil parish in St Helens, Merseyside, England.  It contains seven buildings that are recorded in the National Heritage List for England as designated listed buildings.   Of these, four are listed at Grade II*, the middle of the three grades, and the others are at Grade II, the lowest grade.

The parish is partly residential, and partly rural.  The major building in the parish is Scholes House.  This is listed, as are two associated structures.  The other listed buildings consist of a house, a farmhouse, a church, and a war memorial.

Key

Buildings

References

Citations

Sources

Listed buildings in Merseyside
Lists of listed buildings in Merseyside
Buildings and structures in the Metropolitan Borough of St Helens